A mobile browser is a web browser designed for use on a mobile device such as a mobile phone or PDA. Mobile browsers are optimized to display Web content most effectively on small screens on portable devices. Mobile browser software must be small and efficient to accommodate the low memory capacity and low-bandwidth of wireless handheld devices. Traditional smaller feature phones use stripped-down mobile web browsers; however, most current smartphones have full-fledged browsers that can handle the latest web technologies, such as CSS 3, JavaScript, and Ajax.

Websites designed to be usable in mobile browsers may be referred to as wireless portals or collectively as the Mobile Web. Today, over 75% of websites are "mobile friendly", by detecting when a request comes from a mobile device and automatically creating a "mobile" version of the page, designed to fit the device's screen and be usable with a touch interface, for example the Wikipedia website (see illustration).

Underlying technology
The mobile browser usually connects via the cellular network, or increasingly via Wireless LAN, using standard HTTP over TCP/IP and displays web pages written in HTML. Historically, early feature phones were restricted to only displaying pages specifically designed for mobile use, written in XHTML Mobile Profile (WAP 2.0), or WML (which evolved from HDML). WML and HDML are stripped-down formats suitable for transmission across limited bandwidth, and wireless data connection called WAP. In Japan, DoCoMo defined the i-mode service based on i-mode HTML, which is an extension of Compact HTML (C-HTML), a simple subset of HTML.

WAP 2.0 specifies XHTML Mobile Profile plus WAP CSS, subsets of the W3C's standard XHTML and CSS with minor mobile extensions.

Smartphone mobile browsers are full-featured Web browsers capable of HTML, CSS, ECMAScript, as well as mobile technologies such as WML, i-mode HTML, or cHTML.
To accommodate small screens, they use Post-WIMP interfaces.

History
The first mobile browser for a PDA was PocketWeb for the Apple Newton created at TecO in 1994, followed by the first commercial product NetHopper released in August 1996.

The so-called "microbrowser" technologies such as WAP, NTTDocomo's i-mode platform and Openwave's HDML platform fueled the first wave of interest in wireless data services.

The first deployment of a mobile browser on a mobile phone was probably in 1997 when Unwired Planet (later to become Openwave) put their "UP.Browser" on AT&T handsets to give users access to HDML content.

A British company, STNC Ltd., developed a mobile browser (HitchHiker) in 1997 that was intended to present the entire device UI. The demonstration platform for this mobile browser (Webwalker) had 1 MIPS total processing power. This was a single core platform, running the GSM stack on the same processor as the application stack. In 1999 STNC was acquired by Microsoft and HitchHiker became Microsoft Mobile Explorer 2.0, not related to the primitive Microsoft Mobile Explorer 1.0. HitchHiker is believed to be the first mobile browser with a unified rendering model, handling HTML and WAP along with ECMAScript, WMLScript, POP3 and IMAP mail in a single client. Although it was not used, it was possible to combine HTML and WAP in the same pages although this would render the pages invalid for any other device. Mobile Explorer 2.0 was available on the Benefon Q, Sony CMD-Z5, CMD-J5, CMD-MZ5, CMD-J6, CMD-Z7, CMD-J7 and CMD-J70. With the addition of a messaging kernel and a driver model, this was powerful enough to be the operating system for certain embedded devices. One such device was the Amstrad e-m@iler and e-m@iler 2. This code formed the basis for MME3.

Multiple companies offered browsers for the Palm OS platform. The first HTML browser for Palm OS 1.0 was HandWeb by Smartcode software, released in 1997. HandWeb included its own TCP/IP stack, and Smartcode was acquired by Palm in 1999. Mobile browsers for the Palm OS platform multiplied after the release of Palm OS 2.0, which included a TCP/IP stack. A freeware (although later shareware) browser for the Palm OS was Palmscape, written in 1998 by Kazuho Oku in Japan, who went on to found Ilinx. Still in limited use as late as 2003. Qualcomm also developed the Eudora Web browser, and launched it with the Palm OS based QCP smartphone. ProxiWeb was a proxy-based Web browsing solution, developed by Ian Goldberg and others at the University of California Berkeley and later acquired by PumaTech.

Released in 2001, Mobile Explorer 3.0 added iMode compatibility (cHTML) plus numerous proprietary schemes. By imaginatively combining these proprietary schemes with WAP protocols, MME3.0 implemented OTA database synchronisation, push email, push information clients (not unlike a 'Today Screen') and PIM functionality. The cancelled Sony Ericsson CMD-Z700 was to feature heavy integration with MME3.0. Although Mobile Explorer was ahead of its time in the mobile phone space, development was stopped in 2002.

Also in 2002, Palm, Inc. offered Web Pro on Tungsten PDAs based upon a Novarra browser. PalmSource offered a competing Web browser based on Access Netfront.

Opera Software pioneered with its Small Screen Rendering (SSR) and Medium Screen Rendering (MSR) technology. The Opera web browser is able to reformat regular web pages for optimal fit on small screens and medium-sized (PDA) screens. It was also the first widely available mobile browser to support Ajax and the first mobile browser to pass ACID2 test.

Distinct from a mobile browser is a web-based emulator, which uses a "Virtual Handset" to display WAP pages on a computer screen, implemented either in Java or as an HTML transcoder.

Popular mobile browsers
The following are some of the more popular mobile browsers. Some mobile browsers are really miniaturized web browsers, so some mobile device providers also provide browsers for desktop and laptop computers.

Default browsers for Mobile and Tablet (current and defunct)

User-installable mobile browsers (current and defunct)

Mobile HTML transcoders
Mobile transcoders reformat and compress web content for mobile devices and must be used in conjunction with built-in or user-installed mobile browsers. The following are several leading mobile transcoding services.
 Openwave Web Adapter - used by Vodacom
 Vision Mobile Server
 Skweezer - used by Orange, Etisalat, JumpTap, Medio, Miva, and others
 Teashark
 Opera Mini

Defunct transcoders or sites with removed transcoding functionality

 Google Mobilizer (Google Web Transcoder) — Defunct since February 2016. Replaced with Google Web Light.
 Smartphone site — The last extant snapshot of the site is from 5 September 2012.
 Device-Browser combinations on Cloud 
 Finch — The last snapshot of a functional Finch site is from 28 February 2009. This defunct service should not be confused with Finch (software). Finch the transcoder became Squeezr!Beta as early as 8 December 2009.
Squeezr!Beta — The last functional Squeezr!Beta page is dated 13 February 2010. As of 28 August 2010, Squeezr!Beta had closed; the last page of Squeezr as authored by Adam Brenecki is dated 2 January 2012. Since 2013, squeezr.net redirected to squeezr.it, which is a different service, and not related to Adam Brenecki.
 Microsoft Bing — the option to enable or disable "Optimize web pages for your phone" in "Search settings" is not visible in Bing's mobile version as of March 2018. (The mobile version can be accessed with a phone or tablet, or when setting a web browser to identify itself with a mobile-based user agent string.)
 MobileLeap Transcoding Engine, by MobileLeap Inc. As of March 2018, web page source code includes JavaScript from the domain parking company Sedo) — The site wouldn't allow entry without a cookie, so a typical crawler would be redirected to mlvb's cookiecheck page, the last snapshot of which is from 12 October 2017.
 Mowser (mowser.com) — Alternately marketed with the mowser.mobi domain name, which is now a permanent deadlink. The last snapshot of a working page is dated 22 September 2017. As of 30 March 2018, the site has been shut down.

See also 
Browser wars
Device Description Repository
i-mode
Information appliance
Mobile Web
Mobile content
Usage share of web browsers
User agent

References

External links
W3C Mobile Web Initiative — “The Mobile Web Initiative's goal is to make browsing the Web from mobile devices a reality”, explains Tim Berners-Lee, W3C Director and inventor of the Web.
Compact HTML for Small Information Appliances — W3C NOTE 9 February 1998
Open Mobile Alliance
Blackberry Browser Developer site

 
Browser